Arana Hills is a suburb in the Moreton Bay Region, Queensland, Australia.

Geography
Informally it is part of the Hills District.

History 

Pine Community School opened in Arana Hills on 24 January 1983.

In 2008, Arana Hills was affected by severe thunderstorms that also affected many properties in northern Brisbane, causing millions of dollars of damage. Many volunteers and SES crews were needed to help clean up the damage. The area has now returned to its original state, but with the loss of some trees.

The median age of the Arana Hills population was 35 years, 2 years below the national median of 37. 82.5% of people living in Arana Hills were born in Australia. The other top responses for country of birth were England 3.5%, New Zealand 3.3%, South Africa 0.9%, Scotland 0.5%, Papua New Guinea 0.5%. 92.7% of people spoke only English at home; the next most common languages were 0.4% Hindi, 0.4% Cantonese, 0.4% Italian, 0.3% Afrikaans, 0.3% German.

Education 
Pine Community School is a private primary (Prep-6) school for boys and girls at 123 Bunya Road. In 2018, the school had an enrolment of 94 students with 11 teachers (9 full-time equivalent) and 8 non-teaching staff (6 full-time equivalent).

There are no government schools in Arana Hills. The nearest government primary schools are Grovely State School in neighbouring Keperra to the south-east, Ferny Hills State School in neighbouring Ferny Hills to the south-west, and Patricks Road State School also in neighbouring Ferny Hills to the west. The nearest secondary schools are Mitchelton State High School in Mitchelton to the south-east and Ferny Grove State High School in Ferny Grove to the south-west.

Amenities 

Arana Hills is served by several neighbourhood shopping villages as well as a commercial indoor shopping complex anchored by a Kmart and Coles supermarket which opened in 1978.

The Moreton Bay Regional Council operates a Public Library in Arana Hills at 63 Cobbity Crescent, the library was opened in 1976.

Arana Hills Uniting Church (also known as The Hills Uniting Church) is at 14 Alstonia Street.

Parks 
There are a number of parks in the area:

 Bandicoot Gully
 Bob O'Neil Park

 Brian Battersby Reserve

 Camden Park

 John Carter Park

 Leslie Patrick Park

 Sue Miller Park

 Wightman Reserve

 William Scott Park

References

Welch, Melva A. (1984). "Bowling along with the Patricks at Mt Pleasant Homestead"
Welch, Melva A. (1981). "Toponymy, a list of placenames in the Hills & Bunya Districts"
Smith, Lawrence S. (1988). "Tracks and Times; A history of the Pine Rivers district"

External links

 
Bunyaville Forest Reserve
Ferny Hills Progress Association
George Willmore

Suburbs of Moreton Bay Region